Rugby Club Valpolicella is an Italian professional rugby union team based in Valpolicella, which competes in the Serie A.

Valpolicella was founded in 1974 and have won 15 Italian national championships.

Stadium 
The team plays at the Campo Sportivo Comunale in Valpolicella.

Former players 
 Juan Francisco Ymaz
 Jerónimo Etcheverry
 Gastón Mieres

External links
 Official site

Rugby clubs established in 1974
Italian rugby union teams
Serie A (rugby union) teams